"Plain" is a song by New Zealand singer-songwriter Benee featuring British singer Lily Allen and American rapper Flo Milli, released through Republic Records on 27 October 2020 as the third single from her debut studio album Hey U X (2020).

Background 
The release of "Plain" was preceded by the singles "Night Garden" and "Snail". On the motive behind the track, Benee told NME:

The song was released as a surprise release with no prior announcement on 27 October 2020 by Republic Records.

Composition and reception 
Musically, "Plain" is an alternative pop song that contains "glossy, rolling, trap-heavy beats". The song was described as "self-assured" with its "dreamy guitar hook" and a "thumping beat". Chris DeVille of Stereogum drew comparison between the song's "foggy, blippy, chillwave-adjacent mood" and that of "Clairo with a trap beat". He noted that "the sonic soup is a great environment for Benee, even if it somewhat blurs her voice together with Allen's and therefore obscures the flex of featuring her alt-pop forebear on a song. No such trouble with Flo Milli, who adds a burst of enthusiasm to the track upon arrival." Sose Fuamoli of Triple J described "Plain" as "a message to the ex, delivered with sass and dreamy sounds." She praised Allen's featured verse, describing it as "a beautifully melancholic one" and that by "coupl[ing it] with Benee's already captivating style of vocal delivery, bringing Lily into a song like this feels like a natural flex." Towards the end of the track, Mike Wass of Idolator wrote "Ouch! It turns out the song is meant to be a raised middle-finger to an ex."

Charts

References

2020 singles
2020 songs
Benee songs
Flo Milli songs
Lily Allen songs
Republic Records singles
Songs written by Benee
Songs written by Flo Milli
Songs written by Jason Schoushkoff
Songs written by Jenna Andrews
Songs written by Josh Fountain
Songs written by Lily Allen
Song recordings produced by Josh Fountain